Adams Township is one of nine townships in Decatur County, Indiana.  As of the 2010 census, its population was 1,944 and it contained 793 housing units.

History
Adams Township was organized in 1822.

Geography

Unincorporated towns
 Adams
 Downeyville
 Germantown
 Saint Omer
 Saint Paul
(This list is based on USGS data and may include former settlements.)

Adjacent townships
 Orange Township, Rush County (north)
 Anderson Township, Rush County (northeast)
 Clinton Township (east)
 Washington Township (southeast)
 Clay Township (southwest)
 Noble Township, Shelby County (west)
 Liberty Township, Shelby County (northwest)

Major highways
  Interstate 74

Cemeteries
The township contains four cemeteries: Arnold, Mount Hebron, Shiloh and Union.

References
 
 United States Census Bureau cartographic boundary files

External links

 Indiana Township Association
 United Township Association of Indiana

Townships in Decatur County, Indiana
Townships in Indiana
1822 establishments in Indiana
Populated places established in 1822